Apamea digitula is a moth of the family Noctuidae. It was described from the Laguna Mountains of San Diego County, California, in 2006. It is also known from western Oregon.

The living moth may have a greenish cast. There may be tufts on some abdominal segments. The male has beaded antennae.

The moth inhabits various habitat types, including moist grassland, coastal rainforest, oak savanna, disturbed cropland and urban areas, and the hardwood and coniferous forests of the Cascades.

References

Apamea (moth)
Moths described in 2006
Endemic fauna of California
Moths of North America
Natural history of Oregon
Fauna without expected TNC conservation status